This article lists events from the year 2016 in Morocco.

Incumbents
King: Mohammed VI
Prime Minister: Abdelilah Benkirane

Events
7 October – Moroccan general election, 2016
7-18 November – the 2016 United Nations Climate Change Conference was held in Marrakesh

Sport
5-21 August – Morocco at the 2016 Summer Olympics: 49 competitors in 13 sports

Deaths

18 January – Leila Alaoui, photographer and video artist (b. 1982).

5 February – Tayeb Saddiki, playwright (b. 1938).

10 February – Abdel-Bari Zamzami, religious leader (b. 1943).

References

Links

 
2010s in Morocco
Years of the 21st century in Morocco
Morocco
Morocco